Coraje (Spanish for "courage") may refer to:

 Coraje Ábalos (b. 1972), an Argentine actor
 "Coraje", a song by Arca from Arca
 "Coraje", a song by 
 "Coraje", a song by Memphis la Blusera
 "Coraje", a song by Yandel
 "Coraje", a song by WarCry from Revolución

See also
 
 "Corashe", a song by Nathy Peluso